The Burbank–Glendale–Pasadena Airport Authority Police (BGPAA PD) is a law enforcement agency with responsibility for security and police functions at Hollywood Burbank Airport. It is an arm of the Bob Hope Airport, which represents the three cities that own the airport (Burbank, Glendale and Pasadena).

Despite proximity to Los Angeles and Van Nuys airports, the BGPAA PD is an independent agency and is not affiliated with the Los Angeles Airport Police, other than for liaison purposes. It is also separate from the police departments of the cities that own the airport.

Airport Police officers are peace officers under California law and have authority anywhere in the state. Authorized strength is 34 sworn officers. The chief of police is Edward B. Skvarna.

BGPAA PD arrested Snoop Dogg at the airport in 2006.

External links

BGPAA Police

References

Airport police departments of the United States
Specialist police departments of California
Government of Los Angeles County, California